The Imperial Austrian Order of Franz Joseph was founded by Emperor Franz Joseph I of Austria on 2 December 1849, on the first anniversary of his accession to the imperial throne.

Classes
The order was originally awarded in three classes: Grand Cross, Commander's Cross, and Knight's Cross. In 1869, the class of Commander with Star was added, which ranked immediately below the Grand Cross. The Officer's Cross, which ranked between Commander and Knight, was introduced on 1 February 1901.

The order ceased to exist as a governmental award with the dissolution of the Austro-Hungarian Empire in 1918. It was not re-established with the foundation of the Republic of Austria. However, it remains active as a dynastic order of the House of Habsburg.

Description
Knights wore the decoration suspended from a triangular ribbon on the left breast. Officers wore it on the left breast without a ribbon. Commanders wore the decoration at the neck, as did Commander with Star, who also wore a breast star. The Grand Cross was worn suspended from the shoulder and also came with a breast star. The ribbon of all classes of the order was plain red.

In common with the other Austro-Hungarian awards of the period, the Franz Joseph Order was further distinguished with the addition of the War decoration and Swords which could be awarded for military merit. However, if soldiers were honoured, it was usually for distinguished service as opposed to gallantry in the face of the enemy.

Notable recipients

 Pakubowono X
 Živojin Mišić
 Émile Baudot
 Benjamin Thomas Brandreth-Gibbs
 Anton Bruckner
 Paškal Buconjić
 Georg Decker, portrait artist
 Carl Fürstenberg
 Abraham Salomon Camondo
Nezir Škaljić
 Baron Adrien Goffinet
 Prince Julius Eisner Von Eisenhof
 Hans Gude
 Carl von In der Maur
 Ndre Mjeda
 Gjergj Fishta
 Hussein Kamel of Egypt
 Auguste, Baron Lambermont
 Jan Matejko
 Johann Münzberg
 Alexander Marmorek
 Philipp Sarlay
 Napoleon Touzet
 Anton Dreher
 Anton Dreher Jr.
 Julius Epstein
 Karl Samuel Grünhut

See also
 Nobility
 Order of chivalry
 Order of Leopold
 Order of St. George (Habsburg-Lorraine)
 Order of the Iron Crown
 Orders, decorations, and medals of Austria-Hungary

References

External links

Orders of chivalry of Austria
Orders, decorations, and medals of Austria-Hungary
1849 establishments in the Austrian Empire
 6
Awards established in 1849